William Schuette (November 5, 1933 – September 21, 2002) was an American sprint canoer who competed in the 1950s. Competing in two Summer Olympics, he earned his best finish of ninth in the C-1 1000 m event at Melbourne in 1956.

References
William Schuette's profile at Sports Reference.com

1933 births
2002 deaths
American male canoeists
Canoeists at the 1952 Summer Olympics
Canoeists at the 1956 Summer Olympics
Olympic canoeists of the United States